The Populist Party Ontario (PPO) is a minor political party in Ontario, Canada. The party began its registration process with Elections Ontario upon Shelley Batcules' request on December 17, 2021, and its party name was approved on January 24, 2022. The PPO was then officially confirmed as a registered party with Elections Ontario on May 9, 2022.

The party is led by Jim Torma, the former People's Party of Canada regional coordinator for Southwestern Ontario. A total of 13 candidates contested in the 2022 Ontario general election, including former PPC candidates from the 2021 Canadian federal election such as Chelsea Hillier, who contested the Lanark—Frontenac—Kingston seat held by her father Randy Hillier at the time. The party failed to win any seats in the 2022 Ontario general election. The PPO currently has one riding association in Sarnia—Lambton.

Election results

See also

Notes

External links
 Party website

Provincial political parties in Ontario